Anthony Amado (born February 28, 1963) is an American wrestler and coach. He competed in the men's Greco-Roman 57 kg at the 1988 Summer Olympics. He wrestled collegiately for Portland State University and won the NCAA Division II national championship in 1985. As of June 2019 he is an assistant coach at Warner Pacific College.

References

1963 births
Living people
American male sport wrestlers
Olympic wrestlers of the United States
Wrestlers at the 1988 Summer Olympics
Sportspeople from Topeka, Kansas
American wrestling coaches
Pan American Games medalists in wrestling
Pan American Games bronze medalists for the United States
Wrestlers at the 1987 Pan American Games